Stenandrium  is a genus of flowering plants in the family Acanthaceae native to the Americas.

Species
Species include:
Stenandrium affine S. Moore
Stenandrium amoenum (Benoist) Vollesen
Stenandrium barbatum Torr. & A. Gray
Stenandrium carduaceum (Benoist) Vollesen
Stenandrium chameranthemoideum Oerst.
Stenandrium diphyllum Nees
Stenandrium dulce (Cav.) Nees
Stenandrium elegans Nees
Stenandrium gabonicum (Benoist) Vollesen
Stenandrium goiasense Wassh.
Stenandrium grandiflorum Vollesen
Stenandrium guineense (Nees) Vollesen
Stenandrium harlingii Wassh.
Stenandrium hatschbachii Wassh.
Stenandrium hirsutum Nees & Mart.
Stenandrium humile (Benoist) Vollesen
Stenandrium irwinii Wassh.
Stenandrium leptostachyum (Benoist) Vollesen
Stenandrium longifolium (Benoist) Vollesen
Stenandrium lyonii J.R.Johnst.
Stenandrium manchonense T.F. Daniel
Stenandrium mandioccanum Nees
Stenandrium nanum (Standl.) T.F. Daniel
Stenandrium orichalcea Donn. Sm.
Stenandrium pauciflorum Vollesen
Stenandrium pedunculatum (Donn.Sm.) Leonard
Stenandrium perrieri (Benoist) Vollesen
Stenandrium pinetorum (Britton & P.Wilson) Alain
Stenandrium pohlii Nees
Stenandrium praecox S. Moore
Stenandrium radicosum Nees
Stenandrium riedelianum Nees
Stenandrium rupestre (Sw.) Nees
Stenandrium serpens Nees
Stenandrium stenophyllum Kameyama
Stenandrium subcordatum Standl.
Stenandrium subdentatum (Benoist) Vollesen
Stenandrium tenellum Nees
Stenandrium thompsonii (S. Moore) Vollesen
Stenandrium verticillatum Brandegee

References

External links

PlantSystematics: Stenandrium

 
Acanthaceae genera